In physics, decompression refers to a reduction of pressure or compression, and to some extent, to the consequences of a reduction of pressure. Decompression has obvious consequences when applied to gases or liquids containing dissolved gases.

Pressure
Mechanics